KHSM is a class C radio station broadcasting out of McKinleyville, California.

History
KHSM began broadcasting on August 12, 2011.

References

External links
 

Mass media in Humboldt County, California
Radio stations established in 2014
HSM
2014 establishments in California
California State Polytechnic University, Humboldt